The Bishop of Hallam is the ordinary of the Roman Catholic Diocese of Hallam in the Province of Liverpool, England.

On 20 May 2014, the Right Reverend Ralph Heskett, C.Ss.R., was appointed the 3rd Bishop of Hallam by Pope Francis. Bishop Heskett had served as  Bishop of Gibraltar from 2010 to 2014.

The Diocese of Hallam takes its name after Hallamshire, an historical area of South Yorkshire, and was erected on 30 May 1980 from parts of the dioceses of Leeds and Nottingham. The see is in the City of Sheffield where the bishop's seat is located at the Cathedral Church of Saint Marie. The bishop's official address is The Diocesan Centre, St. Charles' Street, Sheffield.

List of the Bishops of Hallam

References

Hallam
Roman Catholic Diocese of Hallam